Manapurathu Verghese George (3 October 1928 - 9 December 2019) was an Indian photochemist and an Emeritus professor of the National Institute for Interdisciplinary Science and Technology (NIIST). He was known for establishing the Photochemistry Research Unit at NIIST and his studies on the mechanism of organic reactions. He is a recipient of the 1992 TWAS Award and an elected fellow of The World Academy of Sciences, the Indian National Science Academy and the Indian Academy of Sciences. The Council of Scientific and Industrial Research, the apex agency of the Government of India for scientific research, awarded him the Shanti Swarup Bhatnagar Prize for Science and Technology, one of the highest Indian science awards, in 1973, for his contributions to chemical sciences.

Biography 

M. V. George, born on 3 October 1928 in the south Indian state of Kerala, graduated in chemistry from Madras University in 1948 and moved to Dr. Bhimrao Ambedkar University (then known as Agra University) from where he secured his master's degree in 1951. He did his doctoral studies at St. John's College, Agra of Agra University under the guidance of P. I. Ittyerah, a former principal of the college, and after securing PhD in 1954, he did his post-doctoral studies at various colleges in the US, UK, Germany and Canada.

He returned to India in 1963 and started his career as a member of faculty at the Indian Institute of Technology, Kanpur. He stayed at the institution for quarter of a century until 1988 during which period he headed the Department of Chemistry from 1966 to 1969, succeeding C. N. R. Rao. Returning to his home state of Kerala in 1988, he joined the Regional Research Laboratory of Council of Scientific and Industrial Research (present-day National Institute for Interdisciplinary Science and Technology) as an emeritus professor and served the institution until his superannuation from service. In between, he had various stints at University of Notre Dame as a visiting professor during 1978–2001.

Legacy 
The main focus of George's researches were centered on the mechanical implications of the thermal and photochemical organic reactions. His studies covered different areas of organometallic chemistry and he worked on electron transfer processes, organic reactions and functional group transformations. Thus he studied the organic reactions and functional group transformations, heterohexa-1, 3, 5-triene systems with regard to its electrocyclic reactions and the synthetic utility and phototransformations of dibenzobarrelenes. He also studied the picosecond laser flash photolysis techniques and the transient intermediates involved in photoreactions. He was noted for the original approach in his studies of hetero-aromatic systems.

George published his researches through over 200 articles in peer-reviewed journals and guided a number of doctoral and post-doctoral scholars in their researches. He has contributed chapters to Handbook of Chemistry and Physics, edited by C. N. R. Rao and his works have been cited by various authors in their publications. He pioneered photochemistry research at  National Institute for Interdisciplinary Science and Technology and established the Photochemistry Research Unit at the institution. He was a collaborator of C. N. R. Rao in popularizing science education at academic levels and is associated, as the executive director, with the Foundation for Capacity Building in Science (FCBS) initiative which promotes science education among Indian students through seminars and workshops. He also served as a member of the council of the Indian National Science Academy from 1989 to 1991.

Awards and honors 
The Indian Academy of Sciences elected George as a fellow in 1973 before he became an elected fellow of the Indian National Science Academy in 1975. The Council of Scientific and Industrial Research awarded him the Shanti Swarup Bhatnagar Prize, one of the highest Indian science awards, in 1973. He received the C. V. Raman Award in 1985 and the Professor T. R. Seshadri 70th Birthday Commemoration Medal of the Indian National Science Academy in 1990. The World Academy of Sciences awarded him the TWAS Prize in 1992 and two years later, elected him as their fellow. He is also a recipient of the Lifetime Achievement Award of the Chemical Research Society of India and a life member of the society.

Selected bibliography

Books

Articles

See also 

 Henry Gilman
 Melvin Spencer Newman
 Derek Barton
 Rolf Huisgen
 C. N. R. Rao
 K. George Thomas

Notes

References

External links 
 

Recipients of the Shanti Swarup Bhatnagar Award in Chemical Science
1928 births
2019 deaths
Scientists from Kerala
Malayali people
Indian organic chemists
Photochemists
Indian scientific authors
Dr. Bhimrao Ambedkar University alumni
University of Madras alumni
University of Toronto alumni
Iowa State University alumni
Academics of Imperial College London
Ohio State University alumni
Academic staff of IIT Kanpur
University of Notre Dame faculty
Fellows of the Indian Academy of Sciences
Fellows of the Indian National Science Academy
TWAS fellows
TWAS laureates
20th-century Indian chemists